Sport Aviation is an aviation magazine published since 1953 starting as The Experimenter. The content focuses on experimental homebuilding of aircraft and general aviation topics, including antique, war, and classic aircraft.

History
In 1953 the Experimental Aircraft Association (EAA) released a two-page newsletter named The Experimenter. The newsletter was written and published by founding members Paul and Audrey Poberezny along with other volunteers. It quickly changed to a magazine format published by Times Publishing (Random Lake, Wisconsin). The Experimenter was renamed to Sport Aviation but the name was reused in 2012 for the new EAA online magazine focusing on homebuilt aircraft. Sport Aviation became a benefit of membership in the organization.

EAA Experimenter ended its publications in May 2015. This free online magazine focused on homebuilt aircraft, which debuted in September 2012. This magazine is now integrated with EAA Sport Aviation, and featured in its own separate Experimenter section since July 2015.

EAA spun off sister publications to complement its sub-organizations. These include
 EAA Sport Aviation - The flagship magazine of EAA
 Sport Aerobatics Magazine
 Warbirds Magazine
 Vintage Airplane Magazine
 EAA Airventure Today - A daily newspaper distributed for eight days at the annual EAA AirVenture Airshow in Oshkosh

References

External links
 

Aviation magazines
English-language magazines
Experimental Aircraft Association
Magazines established in 1953
Monthly magazines published in the United States
Magazines published in Wisconsin